The sixth and final season of the American television series Supergirl, which is based on the DC Comics character Kara Zor-El / Supergirl and premiered on The CW on March 30, 2021, and consisted of 20 episodes. It is set in the Arrowverse, sharing continuity with the other television series of the universe. The season is produced by Berlanti Productions, Warner Bros. Television and DC Entertainment, with Jessica Queller and Robert Rovner serving as showrunners.

The season was ordered in January 2020, with filming beginning that October. Melissa Benoist stars as Kara, with principal cast members Chyler Leigh, Katie McGrath, Jesse Rath, Nicole Maines, Azie Tesfai, Julie Gonzalo, Staz Nair and David Harewood also returning from previous seasons. They are joined by new cast member Peta Sergeant. Former series regulars Andrea Brooks, Mehcad Brooks, Calista Flockhart, Jeremy Jordan, and Chris Wood all return for guest appearances, with the latter four returning in the series finale.

Episodes

Cast and characters

Main
 Melissa Benoist as Kara Danvers / Kara Zor-El / Supergirl 
 Chyler Leigh as Alex Danvers / Sentinel
 Katie McGrath as Lena Luthor and Elizabeth Walsh
 Jesse Rath as Querl Dox / Brainiac 5
 Nicole Maines as Nia Nal / Dreamer
 Azie Tesfai as Kelly Olsen / Golden Guardian
 Julie Gonzalo as Andrea Rojas / Acrata
 Staz Nair as William Dey
 David Harewood as J'onn J'onzz / Martian Manhunter
 Peta Sergeant as Nyxlygsptlnz "Nyxly" and Nyxlygsptlnz A.I.

Recurring
 Jon Cryer as Lex Luthor
 Brenda Strong as Lillian Luthor
 Sharon Leal as M'gann M'orzz / Miss Martian
 Claude Knowlton as Silas White
 Jason Behr as Zor-El
 Matt Baram as Mitch
 Jhaleil Swaby as Orlando Davis
 Mila Jones as Esme
 Andrew Morgado as the voice of the Totem Oracles

Guest

Cast notes

Production

Development
In January 2020, The CW renewed the series for a sixth season. Jessica Queller and Robert Rovner return as the showrunners. In September 2020, it was announced that it would be the final season, with a 20 episode order.

Writing
The twelfth episode was written by Azie Tesfai and J. Holtham. This marks the first time in the Arrowverse that an actor (Tesfai) wrote an episode. Like previous seasons, the sixth season too is inspired by political and social issues in the real world, especially in its second half. Queller said the theme of the season would be "power, and the abuse of power, and the limits of powers, and from without and within". Rovner said the Black Lives Matter movement was another influence on the season. Melissa Benoist, who portrays Kara Danvers / Supergirl, said the season serves as a "self-exploration" for her character, "looking in the mirror and [contemplating] what her power means because it's almost limitless and it makes her so strong on Earth".

Casting
Main cast members Melissa Benoist, Chyler Leigh, Katie McGrath, Jesse Rath, Nicole Maines, Azie Tesfai, Julie Gonzalo, Staz Nair and David Harewood will return as Kara Danvers / Supergirl, Alex Danvers, Lena Luthor, Querl Dox / Brainiac 5, Nia Nal / Dreamer, Kelly Olsen, Andrea Rojas, William Dey, and J'onn J'onzz / Martian Manhunter. In December 2020, David Ramsey was revealed to be reprising his Arrow role of John Diggle in addition to directing at least one episode in the season. In March 2021, Claude Knowlton and Jason Behr joined the cast in undisclosed recurring roles for the sixth season. Knowlton's role turned out be Silas while Behr's role turned out to be Zor-El who was previously portrayed by Robert Gant in season one and season two. In the April 13 episode, Peta Sergeant debuted as series regular and fifth-dimensional imp Nyxly, who would serve as the season's primary villain.

Filming
Filming began on October 13, 2020. It was initially scheduled to begin after Benoist returned from maternity leave, but was later rescheduled to begin on September 28, 2020. However, by September 29, filming was indefinitely delayed, because of delays in receiving COVID-19 test results for the cast and crew, before beginning in October. The early filming of the season worked around Benoist's absence until she returned to work in January 2021. Filming concluded on August 6, 2021.

Marketing
In early August 2020, The CW released several posters of the Arrowverse superheroes wearing face masks, including Supergirl, with all posters having the caption "Real Heroes Wear Masks". This marketing tactic was used to "raise public awareness on the efficacy of facial coverings preventing the spread of COVID-19".

Broadcast
The sixth season was originally scheduled to premiere in mid-2021. However, Superman & Lois went on hiatus due to a production delay caused by COVID-19, so the season premiered early on March 30, 2021. The season continued on August 24, 2021, after Superman & Lois finished its first season.

Reception

References

2021 American television seasons
Supergirl (TV series) seasons
Television productions postponed due to the COVID-19 pandemic